Stourbridge is a constituency represented in the House of Commons of the UK Parliament since 2019 by Suzanne Webb, a Conservative Party politician. The seat was previously held by Margot James, a Conservative who lost the whip during September and October 2019.

Members of Parliament

MPs 1918–1950

MPs since 1997

Constituency profile
Much of the town consists of suburban streets, interspersed with green spaces, with the other settlements being contiguous. Stourbridge borders on green belt land, and is close to unspoiled countryside with rural Shropshire close by to the west. The Clent Hills, Kinver Edge and large areas of farmland lie to the south and west.

Workless claimants, registered jobseekers,  were in November 2012 higher than the national average of 3.8%, at 4.8% of the population based on a statistical compilation by The Guardian.

Boundaries 

Stourbridge is one of four constituencies in the Metropolitan Borough of Dudley, covering the south-west of the borough.

2010–present: The Metropolitan Borough of Dudley wards of Amblecote, Cradley and Foxcote, Lye and Wollescote, Norton, Pedmore and Stourbridge East, Quarry Bank and Dudley Wood, and Wollaston and Stourbridge Town.

1997–2010: The Metropolitan Borough of Dudley wards of Amblecote, Lye and Wollescote, Norton, Pedmore and Stourbridge East, Quarry Bank and Cradley, and Wollaston and Stourbridge West.

1918–1950: The Municipal Borough of Stourbridge, the Urban Districts of Lye and Wollescote, and Oldbury, and the Rural District of Halesowen.

History 
1918–1950

Stourbridge was one of just seventeen constituencies to have a woman candidate, Mary Macarthur, to contest the 1918 general election, the first occasion some women could vote and stand in Parliamentary elections. She stood as the Labour Party candidate. Macarthur was a trades union leader and well known in the area. However the returning officer insisted she should be listed under her married name, Mrs W. C. Anderson.

During this period no ministerial roles happened to have been awarded to any of the members.  Prominent members in social history include:
Wilfred Wellock, who wrote 13 publications, and was an early Gandhian as well as a promoter of increased localism.  At the end of this period, Lord Moyle (as he became) went on to serve Oldbury and Halesowen until 1964 and in the ballot for private member's bills achieved three to legislate in respect of:
Humane Slaughter of Horses
Air Pollution
Children of the divorced (custody etc.) as recommended by the Royal Commission

The constituency was abolished in 1950, with the Stourbridge West and Stourbridge East wards being incorporated into the Dudley constituency. An Eastern section of the old constituency was included in the new Oldbury and Halesowen seat.

1997–date
Before recreation, in 1997, the seat's forerunner, Halesowen and Stourbridge, created in 1974, was held by a Conservative and both of its replacements, including this seat, were taken by Labour in 1997.  The smaller remainder of the Eastern part of the predecessor forms part of Halesowen and Rowley Regis. To compensate from the loss of these areas, The Amblecote ward was brought in from the Dudley West constituency, while the Quarry Bank & Cradley ward was brought in from Dudley East.

Labour retained the seat by just above a marginal majority at the general election in 2001, and retained it again in 2005, with a new candidate, Lynda Waltho, with a marginal majority of 1% of the vote.

The Tories regained the seat at the 2010 election, via their candidate winning, Margot James.

In 2015, Pete Lowe, Labour's parliamentary candidate for Stourbridge had his own beer brewed. 'Born Bred Believes' was brewed by Kinver Brewery in support of his candidacy.

Elections

Elections in the 2010s

Elections in the 2000s

Elections in the 1990s

Elections in the 1940s 

General Election 1939–40:
Another general election was required to take place before the end of 1940. The political parties had been making preparations for an election to take place from 1939 and by the end of this year, the following candidates had been selected;
Conservative: Robert Morgan
Liberal: Ralph Brown
Labour: Wilfred Wellock

Elections in the 1930s

Elections in the 1920s

Elections in the 1910s

See also 
 List of parliamentary constituencies in the West Midlands (county)

Notes

References

Sources

Politics of Dudley
Parliamentary constituencies in the West Midlands (county)
Constituencies of the Parliament of the United Kingdom established in 1918
Constituencies of the Parliament of the United Kingdom disestablished in 1950
Constituencies of the Parliament of the United Kingdom established in 1997
Stourbridge